Helen Arbuthnot (born 17 November 1984) is an Irish professional rowing coxswain and a member of the Ireland Rowing Team. Coxswain for the Paralympic Class LTA (PR3) 4+. Ranked the number 5 in the world between 2010– 2012 [coxed the mixed coxed four team for Ireland in the 2012 Summer Paralympics and is a fully abled person. Arbuthnot became involved with rowing in 2004 and subsequently became cox of the Irish mixed coxed four boat.

The crew finished in fifth-place at the 2011 World Rowing Championships in Slovenia, meaning that they became the first Irish boat to compete at a Paralympic Games in 2012.

She was born on 17 November 1984 in Christchurch, Dorset, to Thomas Arbuthnot.

References
 Athlete profile
 Placed fourth in repechage
http://www.bournemouthecho.co.uk/news/10182864.paralympic_cox_helen_arbuthnot_at_priory_school__christchurch/
http://www.constructionmanagermagazine.com/ciob-community/one-wat7ch-he4len-arbu5thnot-mciob/
http://www.worldrowing.com/athletes/athlete/39886/arbuthnot-helen
https://www.vestarowing.co.uk/category/club-news/page/23/
https://www.paralympic.org/news/sport-week-history-rowing
https://www.rte.ie/sport/rowing/2010/1104/272697-worldchampionships/
https://issuu.com/theirishpost/docs/st._patrick_s_day_magazine/27
http://www.worldrowing.com/athletes/athlete/39886/results/arbuthnot-helen
http://www.paralympics.ie/news/2018/3/9/zouo253txv3orur6bhigaqcz3lko9y

External links
 

Helen Arbuthnot
1984 births
Living people
English female rowers
Rowers at the 2012 Summer Paralympics
Irish female rowers
Coxswains (rowing)